The Trinity is the third studio album by dancehall artist Sean Paul, released in the United States by Atlantic Records on 27 September 2005.

Background
It was recorded entirely in Jamaica, with Henriques collaborating with producers on the island such as Steven "Lenky" Marsden, Donovan "Don Corleon" Bennett, Renaissance Crew, and Rohan "Jah Snowcone" Fuller, among others. Explaining the album's title, Henriques pointed out that it is his third album, and has spent three years in production, being "all done right here in the Third World."

Release and promotion
The album was preceded by the single "We Be Burnin'," which commenced radio play on 22 August 2005. The music video for the single was directed by Jessy Terrero. It was featured on the Black Entertainment Television series Access Granted on 17 August 2005 and premiered online on 18 August 2005 at MTV.com. The single itself has peaked at number two on the UK Singles Chart. It also peaked at number five on the U.S. Billboard Hot 100 and seventeen on Billboard's R&B/Hip-hop charts. The album debuted atop the Billboard Reggae Albums chart and at number 5 on US Billboard 200, selling over 107,000 copies in its first week, the highest ever reggae/Dancehall debut and single week sales for a reggae artist in SoundScan history. The album was nominated for Best Reggae Album at the 48th Annual Grammy Awards. The Trinity was certified platinum in Europe. On 28 April 2006, the album was certified Platinum by the Recording Industry Association of America (RIAA). The album went on to sell 4 million copies worldwide.

In the UK, Atlantic Records released an expanded two-CD edition of The Trinity on 26 June 2006.  It contained all original 18 tracks on the first disc and contained six extra tracks on the second disc including the singles "Cry Baby Cry" with Carlos Santana and Joss Stone along with "Break It Off" featuring Rihanna.

Critical reception
The album received generally positive reviews.  At Metacritic, which assigns a normalized rating out of 100 to reviews from mainstream critics, the album has received an average score of 67, based on ten reviews, indicating "mixed or average" reviews. Tim Sendra of Allmusic gave the album 2.5 stars out of 5, criticizing its lack of pop-sounding music by stating "rather than going even further pop, Paul heads toward a harder, more aggressive sound.... it's still disappointing for Trinity to be as empty and unenjoyable as it is. Maybe even slightly heartbreaking for anyone who really felt that Dutty Rock would be the first in a long series of great pop records Sean Paul would release." Jonathan Ringen of Rolling Stone gave the album 3 stars out of 5 and in conclusion for the review had stated "But while Trinity is consistently engaging, it never quite achieves Dutty's immediate, overwhelming pop appeal. Sean Paul still knows how to get a party started -- he just won't be setting the world on fire." Jay Soul of RapReviews gave the album a 7 out of 10 score, praising the radio-friendly hit singles but criticizing the other tracks by saying; "More than this was how average the rest of the album was - credit to Sean Paul for keeping much of the LP Jamaican-based but, like Craig David's second effort "Slicker Than Your Average," keeping it too localised backfired." Steve Jones of USA Today gave the album a more positive review with a 3 out of 4 star rating, crediting Sean Paul for "staying true to his roots" and keeping the "rawness of his sound" by working with only local Jamaican producers for the album.

Track listing

Notes
  signifies an additional producer

Charts

Weekly charts

Year-end charts

Certifications

References

Sean Paul albums
2005 albums
Atlantic Records albums
VP Records albums